Elpro International School is a school in the city of Pune, India. The school is managed by Hind Charity Trust (HCT).  Dr. Amrita Vohra is the Principal of Elpro International School, Pune. Lord David Evans and Angela french are part of the school’s Advisory Board. Elpro First Steps is the pre-primary wing catering from Pre-Nursery to Kindergarten II. It is one of the biggest school in pune area.

Infrastructure
The school is spread across 2.57 acres of land. The school has a playground, a library, an indoor games room, music rooms and dance rooms. The lab facilities in the school include Composite Science Lab, Physics Lab, Chemistry Lab, Biology Lab, Maths Lab, Computer Science Lab, Home Science Lab. Elpro International School has a campus with Wi-Fi connectivity, interactive screens, laptops, robotics, language labs, etc. The school campus has a one-of-its-kind 3D printing lab. Dhyanchand rooftop multi sports facility, a 18,000 sq.ft. sports field, is present on the school’s premises where the sports festivals are held. The school’s sports facility is used for playing sports such as cricket, football, throwball, archery, long jump, basketball, table tennis, chess and carrom.

School festivals
India’s first “Teachers Tinkering Fest” was held at Elpro International school, Chinchwad in association with the Early Childhood Association of India’s PCMC, Pune chapter. The event was held on World Science Day in 2019 to inculcate experiential learning skills in teachers at the school.

Elpro International school started the Elpro Sports Festival. Elpro International school started the Elpro Sports Festival. Former Indian Cricket Team Captain Kapil Dev attended the Elpro International Festival in 2019. The ace cricketer felicitated the winners of the competitions held during the festival.

Student achievements
In 2019, the U-17 Girls Football team of the school made it to the Nationals by emerging as runners-up in South Zone-II at CBSE Nationals in Belagavi. They were the only girls to represent the city at the CBSE National Football Tournament 2019-20 that was held on 9 November 2019.

Rankings and recognition
As per the Education World survey, the school received a total score of 1139. The school had received a 100% pass percentage in the 2019 CBSE Class 12 results. On 17 June 2019, the school was recognised as a ‘Great Place to Study’ with a felicitation at the House of Commons, London. Principal Amrita Vohra received the award from Baroness Verma of the House of Lords. The school was recognised for its progressive teaching-learning practices and received the recognition on the basis of the Student Satisfaction Index (SSI). The school received an award for making it to the ‘Future 50 Schools Shaping Success’ list by Fortune India.

References

External links

 Official website

Schools in Pune
International schools in India
2011 establishments in Maharashtra
Cambridge schools in India
Educational institutions established in 2011
Central Board of Secondary Education
Educational organisations based in India